Luis Alejandro Giampietri Rojas (born 31 December 1940) is a Peruvian politician belonging to the Peruvian Aprista Party and a retired admiral of the Peruvian Navy. Giampietri ran successfully as Alan García's first running mate in the 2006 general election, and was sworn in on 28 July 2006 and served until 28 July 2011. He was also elected as Congressman representing the Constitutional Province of Callao for the 2006-2011 term. He lost his seat in the 2011 elections when he ran for re-election under the Radical Change party, but he received a minority of votes and the Radical Change failed to pass the electoral threshold and subsequently lost its registration the following year. Before he served as Vice President and Congressman, Giampietri was a Lima City Councilman from 1999 to 2002, elected under the Fujimorist Vamos Vecino, close to-then President Alberto Fujimori.

Giampietri was one of the naval officers implicated in the massacre on El Frontón, a prison island off the coast of Callao.  The massacre took place during Alan García's administration, on June 18, 1986, after Shining Path prisoners staged an uprising at El Frontón and two other prisons.  All the prisoners involved in the rebellion were killed, and Human Rights Watch claimed that evidence suggested that "no fewer than ninety" of the prisoners killed were victims of extrajudicial executions.

Biography 
He was born in the Bellavista neighborhood of the Callao region, the son of Luis Giampietri Berenice and Rosa Rojas Lapoint. He attended the Colegio de la Inmaculada and the San José Maristas schools in Callao, respectively.

He entered the Naval School of Peru, from where he graduated as a Bachelor of Naval Sciences in 1960. Later, he would graduate as a Navy Diver, to later specialize in Demolition and Special Operations. In 1968 he would follow the Basic General Staff Course, in 1974, he would graduate from the Advanced General Staff course at the Higher School of Naval Warfare, in 1983 he would study the High Command course at the same school.

Navy career 
In 1987, during the government of Alan García, he was appointed as Commander of the Center Special Operations Group. As a full member of the Navy, he reached the rank of Vice Admiral, reaching the position of Chief of the General Staff of the Navy in the Second Government of Alberto Fujimori.

He founded the Navy Special Operations Force.

1996 Japanese embassy hostage crisis 

On December 17, 1996, Giampietri was taken hostage by the Túpac Amaru Revolutionary Movement (MRTA) during the Japanese embassy hostage crisis. Key to the success of the rescue operation was the intelligence provided by Giampietri, admiral of the Peruvian Navy at the time and former commander of a special operations group. He received and distributed hundreds of bugged items in the building and himself communicated by radio with the Peruvian military.

Political career 
In the general elections of Peru in 2006, after the triumph of Alan García in those elections, Giampietri was elected 1st Vice President of the Republic and on July 28 of the same year, he was sworn in before the Congress of the Republic for the period 2006-2011 together to Lourdes Mendoza del Solar who was the 2nd Vice President.

In these elections, Giampietri also ran for Congress and was elected Congressman by APRA for the 2006-2011 period, in his parliamentary term he was President of the Intelligence Commission (2006-2007) and a member of the Defense and Production commissions.

Controversies 
Giampietri was one of the naval officers implicated in the massacre on El Frontón, a prison island off the coast of Callao.  The massacre took place during Alan García's administration, on June 18, 1986, after Shining Path prisoners staged an uprising at El Frontón and two other prisons.  All the prisoners involved in the rebellion were killed, and Human Rights Watch claimed that evidence suggested that "no fewer than ninety" of the prisoners killed were victims of extrajudicial executions.

In addition to the above, his links with the Fujimori regime have been criticized (he was councilor for Vamos Vecino in 1995), complaints of corruption and for his criticism of the Truth Commission.

Honours
:
 Grand Cordon of the Order of the Rising Sun (2011)

References

1940 births
Internal conflict in Peru
Peruvian Navy admirals
Members of the Congress of the Republic of Peru
Vice presidents of Peru
Living people
Peruvian people of Italian descent
Peruvian soldiers
People from Callao
Political repression in Peru
American Popular Revolutionary Alliance politicians
21st-century Peruvian politicians
Fujimorista politicians